The Winding Trail may refer to:

 The Winding Trail (1918 film), an American Western film directed by John H. Collins
 The Winding Trail (1921 film), an American Western film directed by George Martin